Roger Guenveur Smith (born July 27, 1955) is an American actor, director, and writer best known for his collaborations with Spike Lee.

Early life
Smith was born on July 27, 1955 in Berkeley, California, the son of Helen Guenveur, a dentist, and Sherman Smith, a judge. He attended Loyola High School in Los Angeles,and graduated from Occidental College (American Studies) in Los Angeles. He then studied at Yale University in New Haven, Connecticut, where he successfully auditioned for the Drama School and switched his pursuit of a graduate degree in history. Additionally, Smith studied at the Keskidee Arts Centre in London, England.

Career
In film, Smith has collaborated with Spike Lee on several works. He has appeared in films such as School Daze, Do the Right Thing, King of New York, 
Panther, Malcolm X, Poetic Justice, Get On The Bus, Eve's Bayou, He Got Game, and Summer of Sam.  During the 1990s, he had a recurring role on A Different World.

In 1996, he starred in the self-written and produced A Huey P. Newton Story, a one-man theatre performance based on the life of Black Panther Party founder Huey P. Newton. Smith received an Obie Award, and a performance was later filmed by Spike Lee and released in 2001.

In addition to his performances in major studio productions, Smith continues to work in and support independent film projects. In 2003, he had a starring role in the Steven Soderbergh/George Clooney TV series K-Street on HBO. Also in 2003, Smith read in the HBO documentary, Unchained Memories: Readings from the Slave Narratives; the film, based on interviews conducted by the WPA in the 1930s with formerly enslaved African Americans, is a compilation of slave narratives with actors emulating the original conversation with the interviewer. Smith was also the voice of Bao-Dur in the video game Star Wars: Knights of the Old Republic II The Sith Lords. He portrayed a corrupt detective in the martial arts/crime film Fist of the Warrior, alongside Ho-Sung Pak and Sherilyn Fenn. Smith starred with Laurence Fishburne and Jeff Goldblum in the 1992 film Deep Cover. He also played a villain in All About the Benjamins (2002) with Ice Cube.  In 2000, he portrayed Agent Schreck in the first installment of the Final Destination horror films. In 2006, he played the main villain in the straight-to-video actioner Mercenary for Justice, opposite Steven Seagal. Smith was in the 2007 film American Gangster with Denzel Washington and Russell Crowe, in which he played the role of  "Nate", Frank Lucas's army connection in Vietnam. Most recently he played the role of "Isaiah" in the 2016 film The Birth of a Nation, a film about the life of Nat Turner.

Smith also had a recurring role in the hit HBO series Oz.

Juan and John, written and performed by Guenveur Smith, is based on baseball's most famous fight--San Francisco Giants pitcher Juan Marichal clubbing Johnny Roseboro of the Los Angeles Dodgers with his bat during a 1965 battle for the pennant at Candlestick Park—which traumatized the playwright as a child.

Smith portrayed American black leader Booker T. Washington in the 2020 Netflix miniseries Self Made, based on the life of Madame C. J. Walker.

Personal life
Smith works and resides in Los Angeles, California, and also resides in New York City. He is divorced from Carolina Smith, the mother of his adult daughter. He and his wife, LeTania Kirkland Smith, have three children.

Filmography

References

External links

Roger Guenveur Smith; aveleyman

1955 births
Living people
20th-century American male actors
21st-century American male actors
American male film actors
American male television actors
Occidental College alumni
Writers from Berkeley, California
Yale School of Drama alumni
Male actors from Berkeley, California
American male dramatists and playwrights
21st-century American dramatists and playwrights
21st-century American male writers